Gulf Football Club  is an Emirati professional football club based in Mirdif, Dubai. The club plays in the UAE First Division League. Their colors are white and purple.

History 
Founded by The Gulf Heroes LLC, a company that specializes in sports academies, Gulf Football Club competed in their first season in the UAE First Division League. In their first season, the club won their first title after beating Dubai City 3–0, and were promoted to the UAE First Division League as one of the first privately owned clubs to compete in the second tier.

Current squad 
As of 22-23 season: “ Information May Not Be Corrected”